Doug Hogue (born February 1, 1989) is a former American football linebacker who most recently played for the Winnipeg Blue Bombers of the Canadian Football League (CFL).

Hogue played college football at Syracuse. He was originally drafted by the Detroit Lions in the fifth round of the 2011 NFL Draft, where he spent his rookie season, primarily playing special teams.  After Week 7 of the 2012 season, Hogue was waived by the Lions and subsequently claimed by the Carolina Panthers. He attended the Panthers' training camp in 2013, but was released during final cuts. He was later signed by the Winnipeg Blue Bombers on January 17, 2014, but was cut during training camp on April 17.

Personal life
Hogue's younger brother, Dustin, is a professional basketball player. He played college basketball for Iowa State. He now plays internationally for BC Enisey of the VTB United League.

Hogue's cousin Gavin Heslop was previously a cornerback for the Seattle Seahawks.

References

External links
 
 Syracuse Orange bio

1989 births
Living people
Sportspeople from Yonkers, New York
Players of American football from New York (state)
American football linebackers
Syracuse Orange football players
Detroit Lions players
Carolina Panthers players